Events in the year 2011 in the Republic of India.

Incumbents

Governors

Events
 National income - 87,363,287 million
 Union Home Ministry wound up the Srikrishna committee on Telangana following submission of its report.
 Arabinda Rajkhowa, chairman of ULFA, was released on bail from the Guwahati central prison.
 India and Pakistan exchange the annual lists of their nuclear installations and facilities under the Agreement on the Prohibition of Attack against Nuclear Installations, which was signed on 31 December 1988.
 Nagesh Pydah assumed charge as Chairman and Managing Director of the Oriental Bank of Commerce.
 Yashwant Sonawane, Additional District Collector of Malegaon burnt alive by oil mafia at Manmad near Nashik (Maharashtra).
 102 lives lost in stampede at Sabarimala Shrine (Kerala).
  Eminent classical singer Bhimsen Joshi passes away at the age of 88.
Karnataka Governor sanctions prosecution of CM B.S.Yeddyurappa.
 Suresh Kalmadi sacked as Chairman of Commonwealth Games Organizing Committee.
 Former Telecom Minister A.Raja sent to Tihar Jail in 2G spectrum case.
 Bombay High Court upholds death penalty for Ajmal Kasab.
 Ahmedabad court convicts 31, acquits 63 in Godhra train burning case.
 34th National Games Held in Ranchi, Jharkhand.
 Kidnapped Malkangiri Collector released by Maoists.
 Supreme Court strikes down CVC PJ Thomas' appointment.
 PM Manmohan Singh and PM Gilani of Pakistan engage in cricket diplomacy on the occasion of India-Pakistan semi final match in Cricket World Cup 2011.
 Supreme Court dismisses Aruna Shanbaug's euthanasia plea.
 Hasan Ali remanded to judicial custody.
 Saina Nehwal clinches Swiss Open Grand Prix.
 DGCA revokes licenses of 14 fake pilots.
Census 2011 shows increase of 181 million in total population.
 2011 I-League 2nd Division begins.
 2 April – India beat Sri Lanka and wins the 2011 Cricket World Cup.
 Dorjee Khandu, Chief Minister of Arunachal Pradesh since 2007, dies in a helicopter crash.
 Anna Hazare undertakes fast for Jan Lokpal Bill at Jantar Mantar, New Delhi.
 Supreme Court grants bail to civil rights activist Binayak Sen.
 Visit of Prime Minister Abhisit Vejjajiva of Thailand to India.
 Five corporate honchos (Sanjay Chandra of Unitech; Gautam Doshi, Surender Pipara and Hari Nair of Reliance ADAG; Vinod Goenka of Swan Telecom) arrested in 2G spectrum case.
 2011 I-League 2nd Division ends.
 Mamata Banerjee sworn in as the first woman and 11th Chief Minister of West Bengal.
 Prime Minister Manmohan Singh announces aid of  225 billion for African countries to develop infrastructure facilities on the eve of IInd Indo-Africa summit.
 J.Jayalalitha, Oommen Chandy, Tarun Gogoi and N. Rangaswamy takes over as Chief Ministers of Tamil Nadu, Kerala, Assam and Puducherry respectively, as a result of assembly elections.
 Supreme Court quashes Karnataka Speaker's decision to disqualify 16 MLA's.
 German Chancellor Angela Merkel conferred Jawaharlal Nehru Award for International Understanding for 2009 by President Pratibha Patil.
 India ratifies UN protocol against human trafficking.
Chennai Super Kings win the IPL for the second consecutive time.
 2010–11 I-League: Salgaocar FC won the title by beating JCT FC 2-0 in the final match of the season.
2011 Santosh Trophy
 Senior journalist and investigations editor with English newspaper 'Mid-Day', J. Dey, is shot dead in Mumbai.
 Election Commission of India launches the IIDEM (India International Institute of Democracy and Election Management).
 Famous painter M.F Hussain passes away.
 New Zealand Prime Minister John Key visits India.
 India gets first e-waste management rules.
 India ranks 123rd on the global environment index.
 Supreme Court appoints committee to examine the secret chambers of Sri Padmanabhaswamy Temple, Kerala.
 26 killed in a series of bomb-blasts in Mumbai.
 Gorkhaland Territorial Administration (GTA) agreement signed.
 India-Bangladesh ink border management deal.
 18 July – India's 25th nuclear power plant being built at Rawatbhata, Rajasthan.
 Newly formed National Green Tribunal (NGT) conducts its first sitting.
 Reserve Bank of India issues draft guidelines for new bank licences.
 Nation celebrates Independence Day on 15 August.
 Parliament passes sense of the house resolution on Lokpal bill.
 Sustainable Competitiveness Report 2011 presented, Delhi is first.
 6.8 earthquake in Sikkim, tremors across India on 18 September.
Land Acquisition, Rehabilitation and Resettlement Bill, 2011 presented in lok sabha.
 PM Manmohan Singh visits Dhaka on a landmark visit.
Aendri Bakshi born to Avishek Baksi and Debashree Bakshi
 2011 Durand Cup
 2011 Indian Federation Cup
 Bhanwari Devi murder case
F1 2011 Race comes to India at the Buddh International Circuit, Noida.
 7 billionth baby born on 31 October 2011, Nargis in Uttar Pradesh.
 Saving Bank Interest rate decontrolled by RBI.
 National Manufacturing Policy cleared by Cabinet.
 Planning Commission releases the second India Human Development Report (HDR) 2011.
 President of Afghanistan, Hamid Karzai, visits India.
 Chhattisgarh police superintendent Ankit Garg is accused of the torture of schoolteacher and alleged Naxalite Soni Sori.
 Maoist leader Kishenji killed in encounter in West Bengal.
 Companies Bill and Pension Bill cleared by Cabinet.
 Indian representative elected to head the Joint Inspection Unit, the UN's only external oversight body.
 India ranks 134th on UN Human Development Index.
 Longest rail (4286 km) of India, Vivek Express, is flagged off.
 Sonia Gandhi (11th) and Manmohan Singh (19th) figures among the top 20 most powerful people on earth in the Forbes list.
 More than 50 killed in fire accident at AMRI hospital, Kolkata.
 150 perish in West Bengal hooch tragedy.
 Court directs 21 social networking websites to take off offensive content.
 Lok Sabha passes Lokpal Bill, Hazare cancels fast due to lukewarm response at Mumbai.
 Cyclone Thane claims 33 lives in Tamil Nadu and Puducherry.

Unknown 
 2011 Dutta Ray Trophy is abolished.

Predicted and scheduled events

 2011–12 I-League
 2011 BC Roy Trophy

Sports

Athletics
 3 January – National School Athletics Meet begin at Pune

Cricket

Domestic season

 Ranji Trophy 2010–11
 Duleep Trophy 2010–11
 Deodhar Trophy 2010–11
 Vijay Hazare Trophy 2010–11
 2011 Indian Premier League
 2011 Irani Trophy
 2011 Inter-State T20 Championship
 2011 BCCI Corporate Trophy
 2011 Syed Mushtaq Ali Trophy
 Ranji Trophy 2011–12
 Duleep Trophy 2011–12
 Deodhar Trophy 2011–12
 Vijay Hazare Trophy 2011–12

International
Test matches
 India – South Africa 3 Test Series, December 2010 – January 2011 (Result Drawn 1-1).
 India – West Indies 3 Test Series, June – July 2011 (Result India 1-0).
 India – England 4 Test Series, July – August 2011 (Result England 4-0).
 West Indies – India 3 Test Series, November 2011 (Result India 2-0).
 India – Australia 4 Test Series, December 2011 – January 2012 (Result Australia 4-0).

One Day matches
 India – South Africa 5 match Series, January 2011 (Result South Africa 3-2).
 India wins ICC world cup 2011 defeating Sri Lanka in finals.
 India – West Indies 5 match Series, June 2011 (Result India 3-2).
 India – England 5 match Series, September 2011 (Result England 3-0).
 England – India 5 match Series, October 2011 (Result India 5-0).
 West Indies – India 5 match Series, November – December 2011 (Result India 4-1).

T-20 matches
 West Indies v India at Port of Spain – 4 June 2011.
 England v India at Manchester – 31 August 2011.
 India v England at Kolkata – 29 October 2011.

Football

Senior
 2010–11 I-League
 2011–12 I-League
 2011 Indian Shield
 2011 Indian Federation Cup
 2011 Durand Cup
 2011 Santosh Trophy
 2011 I-League 2nd Division

Youth
 2011 BC Roy Trophy
 2011 Dutta Ray Trophy
 2010–11 Mir Iqbal Hussain Trophy
 2010–12 Mir Iqbal Hussain Trophy
 Subroto Cup Football Tournament

Regional

 Agartala
 Kolkata
 Mumbai
 Bangalore
 Cochin
 Goa
 Assam
 Guwahati

 Punjab
 Delhi
 Trivandrum
 Kolkata Police Friendship Cup Football Tournament
 Goa Governor Cup
 Goan Super Cup
 Mullick Police Cup
 Sikkim Gold Cup

 Faria Gold Cup
 Traders Cup
 Lt. Governors Cup
 ATPA Shield
 Garodia Gold Cup
 Bordoloi Trophy
 I143'Day Cup
 OIL Gold Cup

International

Hockey

Deaths

January – April
 2 January – Bali Ram Bhagat, 88, former Lok Sabha Speaker
 10 January – Vivek Shauq, 47, actor, comedian.
 17 January – Gita Dey, 79, actress.
 21 January – E. V. V. Satyanarayana, 54, film director.
 24 January – Bhimsen Joshi, 88, musician.
 28 January – Sushil Kumar Dhara, 99, revolutionary.
 3 February – Machan Varghese, 50, Malayalam film actor.
 12 February – Vipindas, 72, cinematographer and director.
 19 February – Suresh Babu, 58, athlete.
 20 February – Malaysia Vasudevan, 66, actor and playback singer.
 21 February
Aranmula Ponnamma, 96, Malayalam film actress.
Premananda, 59, religious leader.
 23 February
Mullapudi Venkata Ramana, 79, screenwriter and film producer.
Nirmala Srivastava, 87, religious leader.
 24 February – Anant Pai (Uncle Pai), 81, educationalist and comics writer.
 1 March – Fateh Singh Rathore, 72, wildlife conservationist.
 3 March
Goga Kapoor, 70, film actor.
Venkatraman Radhakrishnan, 81, astrophysicist.
 4 March – Arjun Singh, 80, politician.
 10 March – Baliram Kashyap, 74, politician.
 12 March – Kumar Indrajitsinhji, 73, cricketer.
 19 March – Navin Nischol, 65, actor.
 20 March – Bob Christo, Indian actor of Australian origin.
 1 April – Varkey Vithayathil, 83, cardinal and religious leader.
 3 April – Rafique Alam, 81, politician.
 5 April – Sujatha, 58, actress.
 12 April – Sachin Bhowmick, 80, screenwriter.
 17 April – Bhawani Singh, 79, titular Maharaja of Jaipur.
 22 April – Madhava Gudi, 72, Hindustani classical vocalist.
 24 April – Sathya Sai Baba, 84, Guru, spiritual leader & educator.
 30 April – Dorjee Khandu, 56, politician, Chief Minister of Arunachal Pradesh

May – December
 13 May – Badal Sarkar, 85, dramatist
 15 May – Mahendra Singh Tikait, 76, leader of farmers, President of the Bharatiya Kisan Union
 3 June – Bhajan Lal, 80, two-time Chief Minister of Haryana
 7 June – Nataraja Ramakrishna, 88, dance guru.
 9 June – M. F. Husain, 95, painter
 11 June – Jyotirmoy Dey, 55, journalist
 14 June – Asad Ali Khan, 74, musician
 18 June – John Perumattam, 89, Catholic hierarch
 21 June
Kothapalli Jayashankar, 76, educator and politician
Suresh Tendulkar, 72, economist
 29 June – K. D. Sethna, 106, scholar and writer
 2 July – Chaturanan Mishra, 86, politician and union leader.
 6 July – Mani Kaul, 66, film director
 14 August – Shammi Kapoor, 79, actor
 18 August – Johnson Master, 58, musician
 22 September – Mansoor Ali Khan Pataudi, 70, cricketer
 10 October – Jagjit Singh, 70, singer
 5 November – Bhupen Hazarika, 85, singer
 9 November – Har Gobind Khorana, Indian-born American Nobel biochemist (born 1922)
 27 November – Ustad Sultan Khan, 71, musician
 4 December – Dev Anand, 88, actor and director (born 1923)
 25 December – Satyadev Dubey, 75, actor, playwright and director
 26 December – S. Bangarappa, 79, former Chief Minister of Karnataka (born 1932)

Major Public Holidays
 26 January – Republic Day (National holiday)
 20 February – Maha Shivaratri (Hindu Holiday)
 8 March – Holi (Hindu Holiday)
 4 April – Gudi Padwa (Hindu New Year)
 15 August – Independence Day (National holiday)
 19 August – Pateti (Parsi New Year)
 21 August – Krishna Janmashtami (Hindu Holiday)
 31 August – Eid ul-Fitr (Islam Holiday)
 1 September – Ganesh Chaturthi (First day of 10 days long Ganesh Festival)
 11 September – Anant Chaturdashi (Ganesh Visharjan/Last Day of 10 days long Ganesh Festival)
 2 October – Gandhi Jayanti (National holiday)
 6 October – Dassera (Hindu Holiday)
 26 October – Diwali (Hindu Holiday)
 7 November – Bakrid (Islam Holiday)
 10 November – Guru Nanak Jayanti (Sikh Holiday)
 25 December – Christmas (Christian Holiday)

See also 

 2012 in India
 2010 in India

References

 
Years of the 21st century in India
2010s in India
India
India